Uncial 0252 (in the Gregory-Aland numbering), is a Greek uncial manuscript of the New Testament. Paleographically it has been assigned to the 5th century.

Description 
The codex contains a small part of the Epistle to the Hebrews 6:2-4,6-7, on 1 parchment leaf (20 cm by 17 cm). The leaf survived in a fragmentary condition. Probably it was written in two columns per page, 25 lines per page, in uncial letters.

Currently it is dated by the INTF to the 5th century.

Text 
The Greek text of this codex is mixed. Aland placed it in Category III. 

It was examined by Ramón Roca-Puig.

Location 
Formerly the codex was housed at the Fundación Sant Lluc Evangelista (P. Barc., inv. n. 6) in Barcelona. Currently it is housed at the Abadia de Montserrat (P. Monts.Roca inv. no 6) in Montserrat.

See also 

 List of New Testament uncials
 Textual criticism

References

Further reading 

  
 

Greek New Testament uncials
5th-century biblical manuscripts